Tragula fenestrata is a species of sea snail, a marine gastropod mollusk in the family Pyramidellidae, the pyrams and their allies.

Distribution
This species has a wide distribution and occurs in the following locations:
 Eastern Mediterranean Sea (Greece)
 Western Mediterranean Sea (Spain)
 Atlantic Ocean (Portugal)

References

External links
 Gastropods.com: Chrysallida (Tragula) fenestrata, retrieved: 20 December 2018
Peñas A. & Rolán E. (1998). familia Pyramidellidae Gray, 1840 (Mollusca, Gastropoda) en África Occidental. 3. El género Chrysallida s.l. Iberus,  suppl. 4 : 1-73.
van der Linden J. & Eikenboom J.C.A. (1992) On the taxonomy of the Recent species of the genus Chrysallida Carpenter from Europe, the Canary Islands and the Azores. Basteria 56: 3-63. [15 June 1992]

Pyramidellidae
Molluscs of the Atlantic Ocean
Molluscs of the Mediterranean Sea
Gastropods described in 1848